The Cambodia Democratic Movement for National Rescue (CDMNR) is an electoral alliance between the two main democratic opposition parties in Cambodia, the Sam Rainsy Party and the Human Rights Party founded in mid-2012 to run together in the 2013 Cambodian general election.

Its slogan is "Rescue-Serve-Protect".

References

Cambodian democracy movements
Political party alliances in Cambodia